The Hellenic  Mathematical Society (HMS) is a learned society which promotes the study of mathematics in Greece. It was founded in 1918, and publishes the Bulletin of the Hellenic Mathematical Society among other research and educational publications. It is a member of the European Mathematical Society.

See also 
European Mathematical Society
List of Mathematical Societies

References

External links

The Hellenic Mathematical Society at the MacTutor History of Mathematics archive

History of mathematics
Learned societies of Greece
Mathematical societies
1918 establishments in Greece